The Gibraltar Women's Football League is the top level amateur women's football championship of Gibraltar. Due to the lack of resources available for women's football, the league has been contested by five teams since 2021, and the league is treated as a development competition. This status means that, as of the 2021 season, clubs are ineligible to enter the UEFA Women's Champions League.

History
The earliest known record of the competition dates back to 1999, when three teams (Manchester United, Lions and Victoria United) took part. However, the league was seemingly abandoned mid-season with Manchester United top of the table. After that, the league was not held for several years, aside from an edition held in 2003 between five middle schools. The league was revived fully in 2005, with Manchester United winning the title. Aside from 2008 to 2010, and the 2011–12 season, the league has been held every year since with a fluctuating number of teams - generally between 3 and 5, with a high of 8 teams participating in 2007. The Women's Rock Cup was introduced in 2013, generally played in the post-season.

Format
As of the 2021–22 season, teams play each other 3 times. With the league only having development status, players as young as 12 are permitted to play and the league has been known to permit roll-on substitutes. As a result, teams are ineligible to qualify for the UEFA Women's Champions League. Each club is permitted to sign up to 3 overseas players without home-grown player status.

2021–2022 Teams
The 2021–2022 season is set to be played by the following five teams. All matches are played at Victoria Stadium. In 2020 it was announced that Europa Point intended to enter the league for the 2020–2021 season, subject to ratification by the GFA. However, a number of factors including the COVID-19 pandemic meant that they postponed (and eventually abandoned) their plans, while Lincoln Red Imps withdrew their side. Lynx announced their women's team in December 2020. It was announced in March 2021 that a new independent team, Gibraltar Wave, would join the league, initially entering the 2021 futsal league. Manchester 62 subsequently returned to the league in September 2021.

Europa
Gibraltar Wave
Lions Gibraltar
Lynx
Manchester 62

List of champions 
Senior champions of the last year. The years before only school championships or five-a-side tournaments were held.
The list of champions

Note: 2013–14 season was played as a nine-a-side league to encourage more clubs to register a team. 2014–15 and 2015–16 were nine-a-side as well.

Performance by club
Bold indicates club still playing in top division.

References

External links
 Football Association

Top level women's association football leagues in Europe
Women
Women's sports leagues in Gibraltar